Inga Berre (born 31 July 1978) is a Norwegian applied mathematician who studies numerical methods for the partial differential equations used to model fractured geothermal systems and porous media more generally. She is a professor in the department of mathematics at the University of Bergen, a scientific advisor to the Chr. Michelsen Institute in Bergen, and a leading researcher on geothermal energy in Norway.

Education and career
Berre earned a candidate degree in mathematics from the University of Bergen in 2001, and completed a doctorate (Dr. Sci.) in 2005. Her dissertation, Fast simulation of transport and adaptive permeability estimation in porous media, was jointly supervised by Helge Dahle, Knut-Andreas Lie, Trond Mannseth, and Kenneth Hvistendahl Karlsen.

She joined the University of Bergen faculty as an associate professor in 2006, and was promoted to full professor in 2013. In 2018 she became chair of the Joint Programme Geothermal of the European Energy Research Alliance.

Recognition
Berre is a member of the Norwegian Academy of Technological Sciences, elected in 2017. In 2021 she was elected Council Members-at-Large for SIAM for a term running January 1, 2022 - December 31, 2024.

References

External links

Making Research Matter - interview with Inga Berre, University of Bergen, 9 September 2020
Interview with Inga Berre,  Carina Bringedal, Univ. of Stuttgart, 11 November 2019

1978 births
Living people
Norwegian mathematicians
Norwegian women mathematicians
Applied mathematicians
University of Bergen alumni
Academic staff of the University of Bergen
Members of the Norwegian Academy of Technological Sciences